The Siwellen (2,307 m) is a mountain of the Glarus Alps, located east of Glarus in the canton of Glarus. It lies on the range between the Linth valley and the Murgtal, north of the Gufelstock.

References

External links
 Siwellen on Hikr

Mountains of the Alps
Mountains of Switzerland
Mountains of the canton of Glarus
Two-thousanders of Switzerland